Loxostege damergouensis is a moth in the family Crambidae. It was described by Rothschild in 1921. It is found in Niger.

References

Moths described in 1921
Pyraustinae